Indingilizi Gallery is an art gallery in Mbabane, Eswatini, established in 1982. Most of Eswatini's top artists have had their work showcased here. The gallery showcases a range of Swazi art including sculptures, paintings, batiks, mohair, ethnic jewellery and pottery.

References

External links
Lonely Planet

1982 establishments in Swaziland
Art museums and galleries in Eswatini
Buildings and structures in Mbabane
Art galleries established in 1982